Major General Syed Mahdi Hasnain, PVSM was a former General officer of the Indian Army. He was the raising commanding officer of the 4th Battalion, The Garhwal Rifles. He was commissioned in the British Indian Army in the 1st Royal Garhwal Rifles in 1941.

Early life and education
He obtained his Master of Arts (MA) in History and LLB from the University of Lucknow.

Military career
He was commissioned into the Indian Army in 1941, as a Second lieutenant in the Royal Garhwal Battalion (now Garhwal Rifles).
After commission, he participated in the Second world war, during which his battalion was deployed in the Burma campaign for the liberation of Burma from the Japanese forces. After Burma, he went with his battalion to Sumatra (Indonesia) to repulse the Japanese invasion.

After the war in November 1946, his battalion was posted in Peshawar, the capital of the North West Frontier Province. In 1947 after the Partition of India, he chose to remain in India and serve in the Indian Army, even though both his elder and younger brothers had chosen to move to Pakistan. While moving back to India, he and his battalion saved over 1000 non-Muslim refugees who were being attacked by locals and brought them safely to India.

In 1959, as a Lieutenant colonel, he raised the 4 Garhwal Rifles battalion and became its commanding officer. Then in 1966, he went on to raise the 115 Infantry Brigade and became its first Brigade Commander. He then commanded the Indian Army's 20 Mountain Division. In the last, he held the post of Director-General, Infantry at Army Headquarters, New Delhi till his retirement on 27 January 1972.

Children
His son Syed Ata Hasnain was also a general officer in the Indian Army. His other son, Raza, was an officer of the Indian Administrative Service, who retired early, and is working in the corporate sector.

Dates of rank

Notes

References

Indian generals
Military personnel from Allahabad
Graduates of the Royal College of Defence Studies
Indian Muslims
Living people
Indian Army personnel
University of Lucknow alumni
Recipients of the Param Vishisht Seva Medal
Year of birth missing (living people)